Forgotten Faces is a 1928 American silent drama film directed by Victor Schertzinger and starring Clive Brook, Mary Brian, and Olga Baclanova. The production was overseen by David O. Selznick, a rising young producer at the time. The film was remade by Paramount in 1936 as a sound film.

The film is preserved with copies at the Library of Congress and the Museum of Modern Art.

This film is Paramount's remake of their 1920 film Heliotrope.

Plot
A criminal Heliotrope Harry (Clive Brook) comes home after a stick-up job and finds his wife Lilly (Olga Baclanova) in bed with another man. He shoots his rival and deposits their baby daughter Alice (Mary Brian) on a rich couple's doorstep. While serving a life sentence, Harry is updated on his daughter's happy life by his old criminal associate Froggy (William Powell). For years, his vengeful wife seeks their daughter in vain. When she finally locates their child, the father wrangles parole from a sympathetic warden. He seeks to ensure permanent protection for his daughter by luring his crazed wife into a trap where she shoots him but suffers a prearranged fatal accident while escaping. The father dies in his daughter's arms, who now knows and appreciates his true identity and love for her.

Cast
 Clive Brook as Heliotrope Harry Harlow 
 Mary Brian as Alice Deane  
 Olga Baclanova as Lilly Harlow  
 William Powell as Froggy  
 Fred Kohler as Number 1309  
 Jack Luden as Tom
 Ernie Adams as Trusty in Hospital (uncredited)
 Symona Boniface as Roulette Player (uncredited)

References

Bibliography
 Dick, Bernard F. Engulfed: The Death of Paramount Pictures and the Birth of Corporate Hollywood. University Press of Kentucky, 2001.

External links

1928 films
Silent American drama films
American silent feature films
American black-and-white films
1928 drama films
1920s English-language films
Films directed by Victor Schertzinger
Paramount Pictures films
Films produced by David O. Selznick
Films with screenplays by Howard Estabrook
Surviving American silent films
1920s American films